Christian Vuissa (born 1969 in Bregenz, Austria) is a Latter-day Saint filmmaker. He is also the founder and former head of the LDS Film Festival, until 2017.

Vuissa served an LDS mission in Leipzig, Germany, from 1994 to 1996. He was involved in the making of Pirates of the Great Salt Lake. He was the director of Baptists at Our Barbecue, The Errand of Angels, One Good Man (2009) (originally called Father in Israel), The Letter Writer (2011), The Reunion (2008), and Silent Night (2012).

Vuissa was also the original story creator and the director of the 2002 short drama film Roots and Wings about Mexican immigrants to the United States.

Vuissa is a 2002 graduate of Brigham Young University's Media Arts program.

Filmography

References

External links

Further reading
 

1969 births
20th-century Mormon missionaries
Austrian film directors
Austrian film producers
Austrian Latter Day Saints
Austrian Mormon missionaries
Brigham Young University alumni
Film festival founders
Mormon cinema
Living people
Mormon missionaries in Germany